Carthage is the county seat of Moore County, North Carolina, United States. The population was 2,635 at the 2020 Census.

Geography
Carthage is located at  (35.329441, -79.408475).

Climate

Demographics

2020 census

As of the 2020 United States census, there were 2,775 people, 967 households, and 497 families residing in the town. Carthage is currently growing at a rate of 1.58% annually and its population has increased by 19.50% since the most recent census, which recorded a population of 2,205 in 2010. Spanning over 7 miles, Carthage has a population density of 397 people per square mile.

The average household income in Carthage is $59,183 with a poverty rate of 11.67%. The median rental costs in recent years comes to $727 per month, and the median house value is $173,900. The median age in Carthage is 43.3 years, 37.5 years for males, and 47.5 years for females.

Demographics 
According to the most recent ACS, the racial composition of Carthage was:

 White: 88.10%
 Black or African American: 7.22%
 Two or more races: 4.23%
 Other race: 0.44%
 Native American: 0.00% (however the Town of Carthage was originally a Native American community prior to 1880)
 Asian: 0.00%
 Native Hawaiian or Pacific Islander: 0.00%

History

 

The town was the home of the Tyson & Jones Buggy Company, a predominant cart and buggy manufacturer in the late 1800s. A common local story is that after the closing of the Tyson Buggy Company, Henry Ford was interested in buying the old plant and converting it into a car assembly line. According to the legend, the owners refused to let Ford buy the plant. He moved on and built his first plant in Detroit, making it the center of auto manufacturing. This story is often repeated despite a lack of evidence, and it does not fit runs contrary to the life of Ford, who was born and raised in Detroit and started his businesses there. A few years after being closed, the former Tyson Buggy plant burned down.

Another common local story is that the town was originally selected as the site for the University of North Carolina. But supposedly city leaders did not want the university built there. City leaders purportedly told the State that Carthage was on too steep of a hill for locomotives to climb and that access to the university would be limited if built there. This often-repeated story does not account for the fact that locomotives were not invented until two decades after the university had been built in Chapel Hill.

The town has an annual event in spring called the Buggy Festival. This event is used to showcase the history of the town and feature music, hot rods, old tractors, old buggies made by the Tyson Buggy Company, and crafts from potteries in the surrounding areas. This event is held in the town square around the Old Court House, recognized as an historic landmark.

Tyson & Jones buggy factory partner, William T. Jones was born the son of a slave and her white owner in 1833. By the time of his death in 1910, William T. Jones was one of the prominent business owners in Carthage. He rubbed elbows with the elite, white, upper class in Moore County during the 1880s, dined with them, threw elaborate holiday parties where most of the guests were white, and even attended church with them. Both of his wives, Sophia Isabella McLean and Florence Dockery were white. Dockery was the daughter of a well-to-do Apex family.

James Rogers McConnell, a resident of Carthage (14 March 1887 – 19 March 1917) flew as an aviator during World War I in the Lafayette Escadrille and authored Flying for France. He was the first of sixty-four University of Virginia students to die in battle during that War.[1]
McConnell was flying in the area of St.-Quentin when two German planes shot him down on March 19, 1917. He was the last American pilot of the squadron to die under French colors before America entered the war in April 1917. Both the plane and his body were found by the French, and he was buried at the site of his death at the edge of the village of Jussy, and was later reinterred at the Lafayette Escadrille memorial near Paris upon his father's wishes. McConnell was commemorated with a plaque by the French Government and a statue by Gutzon Borglum at the University of Virginia, as well as an obelisk on the court square of his home town of Carthage, North Carolina.

The J.F. Cole House in the Carthage Historic District, J.C. Black House, Daniel Blue House, Bruce-Dowd-Kennedy House, Carthage Historic District, Alexander Kelly House, and Moore County Courthouse are listed on the National Register of Historic Places.

Notable people
 
 
Lucean Arthur Headen (1879–1957), African-American aviator, inventor, and entrepreneur
McConnell, James (2021), Artist commissioned for ten murals throughout the Town of Carthage
U.S. President Andrew Johnson lived in the Town of Carthage during his teenage years

2009 shooting

On March 29, 2009, a man named Robert Stewart shot and killed eight people and wounded two others at the Pinelake Health and Rehab Center of Carthage. Seven of the victims were elderly patients, with ages ranging from 75 to 98 years old. The eighth was a 39-year-old registered nurse who worked at the facility. The gunman, Robert Stewart, exchanged gunfire with a local police officer, wounding him in the leg before he himself was wounded and taken to a nearby medical facility.

See also
 Moore County substation attack

References

External links
Official website
Moore County Chamber of Commerce

Towns in North Carolina
Towns in Moore County, North Carolina
County seats in North Carolina
Populated places established in 1796